During the 1990–91 English football season, Norwich City F.C. competed in the Football League First Division.

Season summary
In the 1990–91 season, Norwich had a good run in the FA Cup, which includes a 'live TV' win over Manchester United, ends with a 1–0 home defeat to Nottingham Forest in the quarter finals. The Canaries also reached the Southern Area final of the Full Members Cup before losing to Crystal Palace over two legs. In the league, Norwich finished in a disappointing 15th place, but weren't in relegation danger for much of the season. Youngsters that made their mark that season included Daryl Sutch, Chris Sutton and Robert Ullathorne.

Final league table

Results
Results summary

Results by round

First Division

FA Cup

League Cup

Full Members' Cup

Squad

Transfers

In

Out

Transfers in:  £1,125,000
Transfers out:  £2,050,000
Total spending:  £925,000

References

Norwich City F.C. seasons
Norwich City